Quora is a social question-and-answer website and online knowledge market headquartered in Mountain View, California. It was founded on June 25, 2009, and made available to the public on June 21, 2010. Users can collaborate by editing questions and commenting on answers that have been submitted by other users. As of 2020, the website was visited by 300million users a month.

History

Founding and naming 

Quora was co-founded by former Facebook employees Adam D'Angelo and Charlie Cheever in June 2009. In an answer to the question "How did Adam D'Angelo and Charlie Cheever come up with the name Quora?" written on Quora in 2011, Charlie Cheever stated, "We spent a few hours brainstorming and writing down all the ideas that we could think of. After consulting with friends and eliminating ones we didn't love, we narrowed it down to 5 or 6 finalists, and eventually settled on Quora." Cheever went on to state, "The closest competition that [the name] Quora had was Quiver."

2010–2013: Early growth 
In March 2010, Quora, Inc. was valued at $86million. Quora first became available to the public on June 21, 2010, and was praised for its interface and for the quality of the answers written by its users, many of whom were recognized as experts in their fields. Quora's user base increased quickly, and by late December 2010, the site was seeing spikes of visitors five to ten times its usual load—so much that the website initially had difficulties handling the increased traffic. Until 2018, Quora did not show ads because "...ads can often be negative for user experience. Nobody likes banner ads, ads from shady companies, or ads that are irrelevant to their needs."

In June 2011, Quora redesigned the navigation and usability of its website. Co-founder Adam D'Angelo compared the redesigned Quora to Wikipedia, and stated that the changes to the website were made on the basis of what had worked and what had not when the website had experienced unprecedented growth six months earlier. In September 2012, co-founder Charlie Cheever stepped down as co-operator of the company, taking an advisory role. The other co-founder, Adam D'Angelo, continued to maintain a high degree of control over the company.

In January 2013, Quora launched a blogging platform allowing users to post non-answer content. Quora launched a full-text search of questions and answers on its website on March 20, 2013, and extended the feature to mobile devices in late May 2013. It also announced in May 2013 that usage metrics had tripled relative to the same time in the prior year. In November 2013, Quora introduced a feature called Stats to allow all Quora users to see summary and detailed statistics of how many people had viewed, upvoted, and shared their questions and answers. TechCrunch reported that, although Quora had no immediate plans for monetization, they believed that search ads would likely be their eventual source of revenue.

2014–2017: Continued growth and new features

2014 organization 
Quora was evolving into "a more organized Yahoo Answers, a classier Reddit, an opinionated Wikipedia", and became popular in tech circles. In April 2014, Quora raised $80million from Tiger Global at a reported $900million valuation. Quora was one of the Summer 2014 Y Combinator companies, although it was described as "the oldest Y-Combinator ever".

Parlio acquisition 
In March 2016, Quora acquired the online community website Parlio.

Question details 
Users were able to add descriptions to questions. On December 8, 2015, these were limited to 300 characters, and questions themselves to 150, not affecting existing questions. On August 3, 2017, question details were discontinued entirely and replaced with an optional source URL input field to provide context, reportedly to encourage users to phrase questions more descriptively. Existing question details were stored in comments under respective questions.

Advertisement rollouts 
In April 2016, Quora began a limited rollout of advertising on the site. The first ad placement that the company accepted was from Uber. Over the next few years the site began gradually to show more ads, but still maintained efforts to limit the number of ads and to keep the ads it did show relevant to the users seeing them.

Multilingual expansion 
In October 2016, Quora launched a Spanish version of its website to the public; in early 2017, a beta version of Quora in French was announced. In May 2017, beta versions in German and Italian were introduced. In September 2017 a beta version in Japanese was launched. In April 2018, Beta versions in Hindi, Portuguese, and Indonesian were launched. in September 2018, Quora announced that additional versions in Bengali, Marathi, Tamil, Telugu, Finnish, Norwegian, Swedish, and Dutch were planned.

2017 anonymity changes 
On February 9, 2017, Quora announced changes to their anonymity feature, detaching anonymous questions and edits from accounts. When asking or answering anonymously, an anonymous edit link is generated, only through which the question or answer can be edited in the future.
Since then, commenting anonymously and toggling one's answer between anonymous and public is no longer possible. These changes went into effect on March 20, 2017. Users were able to request a list of anonymous edit links to their existing anonymous questions and answers until then.

2017 Series D funding 
In April 2017, Quora claimed to have 190million monthly unique visitors, up from 100million a year earlier. That same month, Quora was reported to have received Series D funding with a valuation of $1.8billion.

2018–2019: Further growth and data breach 
In September 2018, Quora reported that it was receiving 300million unique visitors every month. Despite its large number of registered users, Quora did not possess the same level of mainstream cultural dominance as sites like Twitter, which, at the time, had roughly 326million registered users. This may have been because a large number of registered users on the site did not use it regularly and many did not even know they had accounts since they had either created them unknowingly through other social media sites linked to Quora or created them years previously and forgotten about them. Quora uses popups and interstitials to force users to login or register before they can see more of the content, similar to a metered paywall.

In December 2018, Quora announced that approximately 100million user accounts were affected by a data breach. The hacked information included users' names, email addresses, encrypted passwords, data from social networks like Facebook and Twitter if people had chosen to link them to their Quora accounts, questions they had asked, and answers they had written. Adam D'Angelo stated, "The overwhelming majority of the content accessed was already public on Quora, but the compromise of account and other private information is serious." Compromised information could also allow hackers to log into a Quora user's connected social media accounts, via access tokens. A class action lawsuit, case number 5:18-cv-07597-BLF, was filed in the Northern District of California, on behalf of named plaintiffs in New Jersey and Colorado by Capstone Law and Franklin D. Azar & Associates, P.C.

By May 2019, Quora was valued at $2billion as a company and it was finalizing a $60million investment round, which was led by Valor Equity Partners, a private equity firm with ties to Tesla, Inc. and SpaceX. In spite of this, the site still showed very few ads compared to other sites of its kind and the company was still struggling to turn a profit, having made only $20million in revenue in 2018. Several investors passed on the opportunity to invest in Quora, citing the company's "poor track record of actually making money." Schleifer characterized the disparity between Quora's valuation as a company and its actual profits as a result of "the high valuation for virtually everything these days in the tech sector."

In December 2019, Quora announced that it would open its first international engineering office in Vancouver, which would deal with machine learning and other engineering functions. That same month, Quora launched its Arabic, Gujarati, Hebrew, Kannada, Malayalam, and Telugu versions.

2020 
In January 2020, Quora laid off an undisclosed number of employees at its San Francisco Bay Area and New York offices for financial reasons.

In June 2020, during the COVID-19 pandemic, Adam D'Angelo announced that Quora would permanently allow for remote work.

2021 
On 19 April, Quora eliminated the requirement that users use their real names and allowed users to use pseudonyms.

On 5 August, Quora began allowing contributors to monetize their content. In addition, the platform launched a subscription service called Quora+ which allows subscribers to pay a $5 monthly fee or a $50 annual subscription to access content that any creator chooses to put behind a paywall.

Operation

Website 
URL format
URLs of questions contain only the question title without a numeric identifier as used on Stack Exchange sites (in addition to a URL slug), and /unanswered/ before the title, if the question is unanswered.

User interface
With the help of asynchronous JavaScript and XML, some site functionality resembles instant messaging, such as updating follow counts and an indicator showing that a user is typing an answer.

Real Name Policy 
Prior to April 19, 2021, Quora required users to register with the complete form of their real names rather than an Internet pseudonym or other screen name; although verification of names was not required, false names could be reported by the community. This was done with the ostensible intent of adding credibility to answers. Users have the option to write their answers anonymously. Visitors unwilling to log in or use cookies have had to resort to workarounds to use the site. Users may also log in with their Google or Facebook accounts by using the OpenID protocol. The Real Name Policy was rescinded on April 19, 2021.

As of 2011, the Quora community included answers by some well-known people such as Jimmy Wales, Richard A. Muller, Clayton C. Anderson, Barack Obama, Hillary Clinton, and Adrián Lamo, as well as some current and former professional athletic personalities, scientists, and other experts in their fields.

Quora allows users to create user profiles with a name and photo, and access to edit count and other site use statistics. In August 2012, blogger Ivan Kirigin pointed out that acquaintances and followers could see his activity, including which questions he had looked at. In response, Quora stopped showing question views in feeds later that month. By default, Quora exposes its users' profiles to search engines. Users can disable this feature.

Answer recommendations 
Quora has developed its own proprietary algorithm to rank answers, which works similarly to Google's PageRank. Quora uses Amazon Elastic Compute Cloud technology to host the servers that run its website.

Currently, Quora has various ways of recommending questions to users:

Home feed question recommendations
In this method, users have a timeline that is personalized to their preferences. Quora also provides "interesting" questions that are relevant to those preferences.
Daily digest
In this method, Quora sends a daily email containing a set of questions with one answer that is deemed the best answer, given certain ranking criteria.
Related questions
In this method, a set of questions that relates to the current question is displayed on the side. This display is not tailored to the specific user.
Requested answers
This feature lets a user direct a question to other users whom they consider better suited to answer it.

Content moderation 
Quora supports various features to moderate content posted by users.  Quora relies on user reporting, and sometimes human moderators, although many complain that most of the more recent moderation actually comes from AI "bots" looking for specific keywords in order to flag content, without human beings doing as much supervision as was done when the site was newer and the membership was smaller and more manageable.  Many members, and former members whose numbers are rapidly growing, complain that in its current state, there is little logic behind moderation decisions, with racism, misogyny, and hate speech routinely allowed, while legitimate content is deleted if it is reported by those who disagree with said content.  Many point to large-scale personnel layoffs as the reason that moderation by AI is often random and illogical, with appeals often ignored.

Top Writers Program 
In November 2012, Quora introduced the Top Writers Program as a way to recognize individuals who had made especially valuable content contributions to the site and encourage them to continue. About 150 writers were chosen each year. Top writers were invited to occasional exclusive events and received gifts such as branded clothing items and books. The company believed that by cultivating a group of core users who were particularly invested in the site, a positive feedback loop of user engagement would be created.

After not selecting any 2019 or 2020 English-language Top Writers, the program was officially retired in April 2021 but will continue in other languages.

Reception

Reviews 
Quora was reviewed extensively by the media in 2010. Quora was hacked in 2018, leading to loss of information of users to hackers. According to Robert Scoble, Quora succeeded in combining attributes of Twitter and Facebook. Later, in 2011, Scoble criticized Quora for being a "horrid service for blogging" and, although a decent question and answer website, not substantially better than alternatives.

Quora was highly criticized for removing question details in August 2017. According to some users, the removal of question details limited the ability to submit personal questions and questions requiring code excerpts, multimedia, or complexity of any sort that could not fit into the length limit for a URL. According to an official product update announcement, the removal of question details was made to emphasize "canonical" questions.

The moderation system of Quora, which relies largely on automation, has been frequently criticized as ineffective, inconsistent, and opaque from the perspective of users. The website automatically flags seemingly innocuous actions (such as pasting a web address in order to cite a source) while appearing to ignore answers, posts, and comments that users have reported as false, highly inflammatory, or harassing. Moderation decisions can be appealed by users, but Quora's handling of appeals is criticized as automated and impersonal, leaving many to wonder how little of the website's moderation is performed by human staff.

The inconsistency of Quora moderation has been blamed for the proliferation of harmful prejudices on the website. In 2014, in addition to being privately harassed, female users noted a ubiquity of pointed, sexist questions about women with more clearly sexist question details whereas the same kinds of questions rephrased to be about men were quickly taken down. One user was subject of a sexually defamatory post containing a photo of her that was taken down by moderation only after the incident was publicized online. Racism and extreme far right viewpoints have been noted to be ubiquitous on Quora despite its policies. 
There has also been an increase of anti-Semitism on the website, as exemplified by a community for Holocaust denial.

Use in influence operations 
In 2018, the People's Daily, the official newspaper of the Central Committee of the Chinese Communist Party, reported on successful results from coordinated use of Quora in foreign propaganda campaigns.

Timeline

See also 
 Comparison of Q&A sites

References

External links 

 

Companies based in Mountain View, California
Internet properties established in 2009
Privately held companies based in California
Question-and-answer websites
Y Combinator companies
Multilingual websites
American websites